Vyacheslav Ivanovich Koloskov (June 15, 1941, Moscow, Russian SFSR, USSR) is a Russian and Soviet sport functionary, vice-president of FIFA (1980–1996).

Career
He was a football player but without remarkable achievements. During his management of Soviet Union national football team was a runner-up of UEFA Euro 1988, Olympic champion of Seoul and bronze winner of Moscow Olympic Games. Soviet football clubs FC Dinamo Tbilisi and FC Dynamo Kyiv won UEFA Cup Winners' Cup in 1981 and 1986.

Soviet Union national ice hockey team won Olympic gold medals in 1984 and 1988, Canada Cup in 1981, World Championships in 1981, 1982, 1983, 1986, 1989, 1990.

Koloskov was awarded by Order of the Badge of Honor (1980), Order of Friendship of Peoples (1989), Order of Merit for the Fatherland (1996).

He was the member of the organizing committee for the winning Russia's bid to host the 2018 FIFA World Cup.

One of his two sons, Konstantin, became a chief financial officer (CFO) at the United States Soccer Federation.

References

External links
 Bio of Vyacheslav Koloskov (RU)
 FIFA.com - KOLOSKOV Viacheslav

1941 births
Living people
Russian sportspeople
Soviet sportspeople
FIFA officials
Russian football chairmen and investors
Presidents of the Russian Football Union